Curiosity is a quality related to inquisitive thinking.

Curiosity may also refer to:

Film and television
 Curiosity (film), a 1967 Yugoslavian cartoon
 Curiosity (TV series), a Discovery Channel technology-oriented program
 Curiosity, a BBC antiques game show presented by Paul Martin
 The Curiosity Show, an Australian educational children's television series

Music
 Curiosity, a British band also known as Curiosity Killed the Cat

 Curiosity (EP), 2012, by Carly Rae Jepsen
 Curiosity (Wampire album), 2013
 Curiosity, a 1986 album by Regina

 "Curiosity" (Carly Rae Jepsen song), 2012
 "Curiosity", a song by the Jets from the album The Jets, 1985
 "Curiosity", a song by Loona from the EP [+ +], 2018

Other uses
 Novelty item or curiosity, an object that excites or rewards attention
 "Curiosity" (poem), by Charles Sprague
 Curiosity (rover), a NASA Mars exploration vehicle
 Curiosity – What's Inside the Cube?, a 2012 online video game by Peter Molyneux
 Curiosity (website), an online education resource site

See also
 Curious (disambiguation)
 Curio (disambiguation)